Stenoporpia dionaria is a species of moth in the family Geometridae first described by William Barnes and James Halliday McDunnough in 1918. It is found in North America.

The MONA or Hodges number for Stenoporpia dionaria is 6458.

References

Further reading

 

Boarmiini
Articles created by Qbugbot
Moths described in 1918